Rodrigue Dikaba (born October 28, 1985 in Toulouse, France) is a DR Congolese international footballer. He currently plays for CS Fola Esch.

Dikaba made his first cap for Congo DR national football team against Gabon on 25 March 2008.

Dikaba officially signed a short-term deal with Oldham Athletic on Friday 20 August 2010. Oldham manager Paul Dickov said of Dikaba, "His attitude is spot on, he is hungry and a very good defender. And he also fits the bill in being a good age,"

He started his only game for the Latics against Bristol Rovers on 4 September 2010 playing on the right side of midfield. He additionally made one additional appearance as a substitute in a Football League Trophy match.

On 18 October 2010 Dikaba was released from his Oldham contract having spent less than two months at the club. He had been injured on international duty and then had defied manager Paul Dickov's instructions to return to the club for treatment, opting to see his own Doctor in Paris.

After three years playing for F91 Dudelange, Dikaba moved to CS Fola Esch

Honours
F91 Dudelange
Luxembourg National Division: 2015–16, 2016–17, 2017–18
Luxembourg Cup: 2015–16, 2016–17

References

External links

1985 births
Living people
Footballers from Toulouse
AS Beauvais Oise players
Association football defenders
Citizens of the Democratic Republic of the Congo through descent
Democratic Republic of the Congo footballers
French footballers
Democratic Republic of the Congo international footballers
Liga I players
CSM Ceahlăul Piatra Neamț players
Oldham Athletic A.F.C. players
French sportspeople of Democratic Republic of the Congo descent
Democratic Republic of the Congo expatriate footballers
Expatriate footballers in Romania
Democratic Republic of the Congo expatriate sportspeople in Romania
Arras FA players
Expatriate footballers in Luxembourg
Black French sportspeople